Fawas Akhras (born September 1946) is a Syrian–English cardiologist known for being the father-in-law of Bashar al-Assad and chairman of the British Syrian Society.

Biography
Akhras qualified in medicine in 1973.

Akhras has been described as "a key figure in liaison between the Syrian and British governments". He is the founder of the British Syrian Society and is involved with a number of Syrian causes.

He is a consultant interventional cardiologist at the Cromwell Hospital in South Kensington, London, and practices at his private medical clinic, Cardiac Healthcare Services, in Harley Street, London. He lives in Acton, London, and is married to former diplomat Sahar Otri al-Akhras. Their daughter, Asma married Syrian president Bashar al-Assad in 2000.

It was reported before the Syrian civil war that he had influence on the Syrian president in domestic affairs. On 15 March 2012, The Guardian published allegedly intercepted emails that appeared to show that he was advising the Syrian President from the UK during the crackdown on anti-regime protesters. According to The Guardian, Akhras used a private email channel to the Syrian president offering advice on how his government should spin its suppression of the uprising, including how best to rebut apparent video footage of Syrian forces torturing children. Speaking to The Telegraph in 2012, Akhras drew comparisons between the start of the Syrian civil war and the 2011 England riots.

References

External links
Al Arabiya reveals the story behind Assads’ leaked emails and what they mean for Syria 2012

Living people
1946 births
Syrian Muslims
People from Homs
Assad family